Viridigona is a genus of flies in the family Dolichopodidae. The generic name is a combination of the Latin word 'viridis' (meaning 'green') and the ending of 'Neurigona'.

Species
The genus includes the following species:

 Viridigona albisigna Naglis, 2003
 Viridigona amazonica Naglis, 2003
 Viridigona argyrotarsis Naglis, 2003
 Viridigona asymmetrica Naglis, 2003
 Viridigona beckeri Naglis, 2003
 Viridigona bisetosa Naglis, 2003
 Viridigona cecilia Naglis, 2003
 Viridigona costaricensis Naglis, 2003
 Viridigona flavipyga Naglis, 2003
 Viridigona guana Naglis, 2003
 Viridigona limona Naglis, 2003
 Viridigona longicornis Naglis, 2003
 Viridigona longiseta Naglis, 2003
 Viridigona magnifica Naglis, 2003
 Viridigona merzi Naglis, 2003
 Viridigona mexicana Naglis, 2003
 Viridigona minima Naglis, 2003
 Viridigona nigrisigna Naglis, 2003
 Viridigona panamensis Naglis, 2003
 Viridigona papallacta Naglis, 2003
 Viridigona ponti Naglis, 2003
 Viridigona puntarena Naglis, 2003
 Viridigona rondinha Naglis, 2003
 Viridigona subrondinha Naglis, 2003
 Viridigona teutonia Naglis, 2003
 Viridigona thoracica (Van Duzee, 1931)
 Viridigona tinalandia Naglis, 2003
 Viridigona viridis (Van Duzee, 1913)

References

Dolichopodidae genera
Neurigoninae
Diptera of North America
Diptera of South America